Johann Georg Ziesenis (1716, Copenhagen – 4 March 1776, Hannover) was a German – Danish portrait painter.

Life
His father Johan Jürgen Ziesenis was a painter from Hanover who had been granted Danish citizenship in Copenhagen in 1709 and whose works included a 1739 Baptism of Christ for Copenhagen's garrison church. After drawing lessons from his father, Johann lived in Düsseldorf, where he gained further training and painted several portraits of the royal family. In 1764 he became court painter at Hanover and in 1766 he was granted 400 kroner by the Danish king "for travel and other expenses". In 1768 he was in the Netherlands, where he produced portraits of William V, his wife and family. He also worked for the courts in Brunswick and Berlin and his daughters Mrs Lampe (Maria Elisabeth) and Margaretha were also painters.

Johann Georg Ziesenis created about 260 portraits and other paintings and sketches in the course of his life, including ones of Crown Prince Frederik (1767, now at Fredensborg), Frederick II and Charlotte of Mecklenburg-Strelitz (future wife of George III of the United Kingdom). In 1764, whilst in his sixties, he painted a portrait of Hans Egede.

Selected portraits

References

Sources

 Arthur Herman Lier: Ziesenis, Johann Georg. In: General German Biography (ADB). Volume 45, Duncker & Humblot, Leipzig, 1900, p 213
 Karin Schrader: The Ziesenis portrait painter Johann Georg (1716–1776) – Life and Work with a critical oeuvre catalog. Münster, Lit Verlag, 1995.
 German Biographical Encyclopedia, vol 10, p 660
 Johann Georg Ziesenis the Younger. In: Ulrich Thieme, Felix Becker among others: general lexicon of visual artists from antiquity to the present. Volume 36, EA Seemann, Leipzig, 1947, p 497
 VC Hawk: The Art of Lower Saxony Circle, 1930, p 305-307
 Helmut Zimmermann: The painter Elisabeth Ziesenis in: Hannover historical music, New Series 14 (1960), pp. 143–148
 A. von Rohr: Father and daughter Ziesenis in: home country. Journal of History, Conservation, Cultural Care, ed. from Heimatbund Lower Saxony eV, Hanover 1905ff, here., 1983, pp. 40–44
 Landesmuseum Hannover: John Frederick, John George, Elizabeth Ziesenis: Hannoversches Rococo, exhibition publication, Hanover, 1937

18th-century German painters
18th-century German male artists
German male painters
1716 births
1776 deaths
German portrait painters